"Everything" is the winner song of Idol 2018 performed by Swedish singer Sebastian Walldén. The winner of the final on 7 December 2018 would get to release the song as their debut single.

Charts

References

2018 debut singles
2018 songs
Universal Music Group singles
Idol (Swedish TV series)